Pimodivir (VX-787, JNJ-63623872) is an antiviral drug which was developed as a treatment for influenza. It acts as an inhibitor of influenza virus polymerase basic protein 2, and has shown promising results in Phase II clinical trials. However, in late 2021, Janssen announced that the clinical development of pimidivir had been halted due to lack of benefit over standard of care.

See also 
 Baloxavir marboxil
 Favipiravir
 Galidesivir
 Nitazoxanide
 Oseltamivir
 Peramivir
 Remdesivir
 Ribavirin
 Triazavirin
 Umifenovir
 Zanamivir

References 

Anti–RNA virus drugs
Antiviral drugs